The University of Bonab is one of the renowned public universities in Iran. The University of Bonab was previously a faculty of the University of Tabriz, Iran, and now, since 2011, is  an independent University  located in Bonab. The institute has ten technical departments — electrical engineering, computer engineering, civil engineering, mechanical engineering, optical engineering, architectural engineering, Textile engineering  and so on. About 3000 students study there.

University of Bonab offers over 20 B.Sc programs in engineering and more than 100 graduate programs of engineering, science, and high technology. A central lab facility serves the research needs of the university as well. Dormitories distinctly for men and women in two on-campus and off-campus buildings serve students all year round. Contributing to the great diversity of university of Bonab's academic staff are academicians with Ph-D’s obtained all around the world as well as in other top universities in IRAN.

References

External links 
University of Bonab
Ministry of Science, Research and Technology (Iran) Portal
Bonab government

Bon
Education in East Azerbaijan Province
Buildings and structures in East Azerbaijan Province
1996 establishments in Iran
Educational institutions established in 1996